Inga lacustris is a species of plant in the family Fabaceae. It is endemic to Veracruz state, in eastern Mexico. It is an Endangered species, threatened by habitat loss.

References

lacustris
Endemic flora of Mexico
Flora of Veracruz
Endangered plants
Endangered biota of Mexico
Taxonomy articles created by Polbot